The International Association of Classification Societies (IACS) is a technically based non-governmental organization that currently consists of eleven member marine classification societies. More than 90% of the world's cargo-carrying ships’ tonnage is covered by the classification standards set by member societies of IACS.

Marine classification is a system for promoting the safety of life, property  and the environment primarily through the establishment and verification of compliance with technical and engineering standards for the design, construction and life-cycle maintenance of ships, offshore units and other marine-related facilities. These standards are contained in rules established by each Society. IACS provides a forum within which the member societies can discuss, research, and adopt technical criteria that enhance maritime safety.

History
IACS traces its origins to the recommendations of the International Load Line Convention of 1930. The convention recommended collaboration between classification societies to secure "as much uniformity as possible in the application of the standards of strength upon which freeboard is based...".

Following the Convention, Registro Italiano Navale (RINA)  hosted the first conference of major societies in 1939 - attended by ABS, BV, DNV, GL, LR and NK - which agreed on further cooperation between the societies.

A second major class society conference, held in 1955, led to the creation of working parties on specific topics and, in 1968, to the formation of IACS by seven leading societies.

IACS was founded on September 11, 1968, in Hamburg, Germany and its headquarters are currently in London.

In 1969, IACS was given consultative status by the IMO. Its membership has increased since that time to twelve. DNV and Germanischer Lloyd merged in 2013; the new entity was called DNV-GL but changed to DNV in 2021.

Due to the 2022 Russian invasion of Ukraine, IACS withdrew the membership of Russian Maritime Register of Shipping (RMRS) on March 11 2022. The RMRS attracted support from only 25% of members in the vote to expel it.

 IACS numbered 11 members that accounted more than 90% of global tonnage.

Purpose
Although IACS is a non-governmental organization, it also plays a role within the International Maritime Organization (IMO), for which IACS provides technical support and guidance and develops unified interpretations of the international statutory regulations developed by the member states of the IMO. Once adopted, these interpretations are applied by each IACS member society, when certifying compliance with the statutory regulations on behalf of authorizing flag states.

IACS has consultative status with the IMO and remains the only non-governmental organization with observer status which also develops and applies technical rules that are reflective of the aims embodied within IMO conventions. The link between the international maritime regulations, developed by the IMO and the classification rule requirements for a ship’s hull structure and essential engineering systems is codified in the International Convention for the Safety of Life at Sea (SOLAS).

Organization
IACS is governed by a Council, with each member represented on the Council by a senior management executive. The position of Chairman of the Council is rotated between the members on an annual basis. Reporting to the Council is the General Policy Group (GPG), made up of a senior management representative from each member society. The GPG develops and implements actions giving effect to the policies, directions, and long term plans of the Council. The chair of GPG is taken by the Member holding the Council chair. Much of the technical development work of IACS is undertaken by several working parties (WP), the members of which are drawn from the technical, engineering, survey or quality management staff of the member societies.

Duty and responsibility of members 
There are more than 50 organizations worldwide that define their activities as providing marine classification. Those classification societies that meet the conditions of membership may apply for membership of IACS. To remain a member, all members are required to demonstrate continued compliance with quality standards as determined by periodic audits.

To promote maritime safety and clean seas, IACS and its individuals carry out research and development on marine-related topics, providing technical support and verifying compliance with published standards.

The classification process begins with the evaluation by the classification society of a submitted design to determine its compliance with the rules. During construction, classification society surveyors attend the vessel to verify that it is built in conformance with the drawings and to the rules. On delivery, the vessel will receive periodic surveys by the society to verify that it is being maintained to the required standard. These surveys generally follow a five-year cycle of annual, intermediate, and special surveys with the extent of the survey varying depending upon the age of the vessel or offshore unit and the type of survey being conducted.

For a vessel to remain ‘in class’ it must meet the class rule requirements at the completion of each survey. Should a vessel sustain in-service damage, the vessel’s owner advises the classification society of record so that a damage survey can be arranged. If the surveyor decides that the damaged vessel no longer meets the rules, the owner must carry out repairs to bring the vessel back into compliance if it is to remain in the class.

Membership
 the members of IACS are:

References

External links
 

International Maritime Organization